Garry Crane (born 25 August 1944) is a former Australian rules footballer in the Victorian Football League.

Crane was recruited to Carlton Football Club from Yallourn North Football Club after winning the club's best and fairest award in 1962 and 1963.

Crane made his debut for the Carlton in Round 17, 1964.

Crane represented Carlton in three VFL premiership teams – 1968, 1970 and 1972.

He was rated the best player on the ground by the voting panel of The Age newspaper in the 1968 Grand Final.

Crane won the club best and fairest award in 1969.

He retired at the end of the 1976 season.

References

External links 
 Garry Crane at Blueseum
 1968 VFL Grand Final match review at Bluesum
 
 

1944 births
Carlton Football Club players
Carlton Football Club Premiership players
John Nicholls Medal winners
Australian rules footballers from Victoria (Australia)
Living people
Three-time VFL/AFL Premiership players